Dawkinsia srilankensis, the blotched filamented barb, is a species of ray-finned fish in the genus Dawkinsia. This species is endemic to the Kalu River in Sri Lanka and it is in imminent danger of going extinct due to tailings from upstream mines and potentially also capture for the aquarium trade. It was bred recently in the Dehiwala Zoological Gardens.

References 

Dawkinsia
Freshwater fish of Sri Lanka
Endemic fauna of Sri Lanka
Taxa named by Falika Ranil Senanayake
Fish described in 1985